Krasimira Bogdanova (Bulgarian: Красимира Богданова) (5 June 1949 – 10 March 1992) was a Bulgarian basketball player who competed in the 1976 Summer Olympics and in the 1980 Summer Olympics.

References

1949 births
1992 deaths
Bulgarian women's basketball players
Olympic basketball players of Bulgaria
Basketball players at the 1976 Summer Olympics
Basketball players at the 1980 Summer Olympics
Olympic silver medalists for Bulgaria
Olympic bronze medalists for Bulgaria
Olympic medalists in basketball
Medalists at the 1980 Summer Olympics
Medalists at the 1976 Summer Olympics